Somaliland has a multi-party system, with a constitutional limit of three official parties at the national level (determined for a 10-year period at the beginning of each decade based on municipal election results, in which more parties are allowed) as an attempt to avoid political tribalism. A single party often does not have win power alone, so the parties must instead form coalition governments. However, despite some parties having affiliations with political internationals of a particular ideology, politics in Somaliland tend to be more clan-based rather than ideology-based. As such, the programs of parties can fluctuate depending on the issues surrounding the clan(s) that support them.

The parties

Former parties

See also
List of Somaliland Political Parties

Somaliland
 
Political parties